Passion in the Desert, or Simoom: A Passion in the Desert, is a 1997 film from director Lavinia Currier based on the 1830 short story "A Passion in the Desert" by Honoré de Balzac. The film follows the ventures of a young French officer named Augustin Robert (Ben Daniels) in late 18th-century Egypt during Napoleon Bonaparte's campaign to capture the country.

Plot
In 1798, Napoleon I has launched an invasion of Egypt. A frail and elderly artist, Jean-Michel Venture de Paradis (Michel Piccoli), has been commissioned by Napoleon to sketch the landscape and monuments of Egypt.  French soldier Augustin Robert (Ben Daniels) has been assigned to keep Venture from being harassed by the other soldiers, but the unrelenting burden of this task soon takes its toll on Augustin. Mameluks attack the regiment's small encampment.  In the aftermath, Augustin and Venture are now separated from their regiment. Walking in the arid landscape, under the blaze of the desert sun, they begin to suffer an unquenchable thirst, and Augustin is infuriated when the artist uses the last of their water to mix his paints.

Augustin abandons Venture, who cannot keep up, but promises to return with aid. Venture, unable to believe that Augustin will return, commits suicide. Augustin wanders aimlessly on his own. His thirst compels him to steal water from native Bedouins, frightening a young woman who startles him in her tent. Several Bedouin men give chase in response, and he flees to some nearby caves where he is trapped until a leopard, appearing out of nowhere, slays a Bedouin who is about to kill him.

Augustin is terrified at first, then astonished when the leopard gives him food and leads him to water. Augustin and the leopard, whom he names "Simoom," develop a strange and mysterious relationship, and he begins to mirror her behavior, living in the ruins of a lost city near the caves.  Stripping naked, he paints his body with dirt and sand, seeking to resemble her golden-brown fur and its rosette-shaped markings. For a while, they are suspicious and competitive toward each other, but a bond has nevertheless been formed. Augustin finds himself jealous when Simoom goes to mate with another leopard, but she later returns to him.

The bond between Augustin and Simoom is then tested.  He saves her from a group of lost French soldiers, who have wandered by and are aiming to kill her for food. Augustin, however, ultimately decides to return to his regiment rather than be branded a deserter or traitor. He dresses again in what is left of his uniform and bicorne and ties Simoon to a pole, but she escapes. Simoom, enraged by his attempted departure, charges and pounces upon him.  He is forced to kill the leopard in self-defense.

Wounded by Simoom and suffering intense heat and thirst, Augustin collapses before he is able to find his way back to civilization. On the brink of death, he is rescued by a passing Arab on a camel, and returned to his regiment.

Production 
Filming took place in Jordan and the ruins in Petra. The movie was filmed in April 1 to June 28, 1995. Director Lavinia Currier invested 5 million USD of her own money in addition to writing and producing the film. Currier used animals that were chosen at birth to be raised with enough human interaction, thereby making the process of filming scenes with the leopard much easier. Despite this, there were some close calls during the making of the movie with actor Ben Daniels. Daniels reportedly almost got bitten by the leopard. Prior to filming, Daniels spent time with a Bedouin family out in the Wadi Rum to develop a feel for the environment, something that would assist him in his acting.

Soundtrack
The follow-up Passion in the Desert film soundtrack was released in conjunction with the film on June 16, 1998 . Composers José Nieto and Hamza El Din compiled up to 17 tracks altogether. A DVD version of the film was released in December 2005.

See also
French Revolutionary Wars: Campaigns of 1798

References

External links
Official Movie Site
 
 
'Passion in the Desert' at Rotten Tomatoes.com
The French Text for "Une Passion Dans le Désert"
The short story "A Passion in the Desert" by Honoré de Balzac; Translated into English by Ernest Dowson

Reviews
Roger Ebert: 'Passion in the Desert'
Los Angeles Times: '"Desert" explores link between man, beast.
Filmcritic.com

1997 films
1997 drama films
Films set in Egypt
French Revolutionary Wars films
Films set in 1798
1990s fantasy adventure films
Films based on fantasy novels
Films based on short fiction
Films based on works by Honoré de Balzac
Zoophilia in culture
1990s English-language films